Jean-Patrick Nazon (born 18 January 1977, in Épinal) is a French former professional road bicycle racer who turned professional in 1997. He is the brother of former racing cyclist Damien Nazon.

Major results

1998
 6th Overall Circuit de Lorraine
1st Stages 3 & 7
 10th Paris–Tours
1999
 7th Memorial Rik Van Steenbergen
 9th Tro-Bro Léon
2000
 Étoile de Bessèges
1st Stages 2 & 5 
 1st Stage 3a Tour de Picardie
 1st Stage 3 Four Days of Dunkirk
 9th Tro-Bro Léon
2001
 1st Stage 2 Tour de l'Avenir
2002
 1st Stage Critérium International
 1st Stage Four Days of Dunkirk
 4th Grand Prix de Denain
 6th Overall Tour of Belgium
 7th Memorial Rik Van Steenbergen
 8th Overall Guldensporentweedaagse
 10th Overall Étoile de Bessèges
2003
 Tour de France
1st Stage 20 (Champs-Élysées)
Held  after Stage 3
 Volta ao Alentejo
1st Stages 3 & 6
 1st Stage 6 Four Days of Dunkirk
 4th Classic Haribo
2004
 1st Stage 3 Tour de France
 1st Stage 1 Critérium International
 1st Stage 3 Tour de l'Ain
 4th Overall Tour of Qatar
 7th Châteauroux Classic
2005
 1st Memorial Rik Van Steenbergen
 1st Stage 1 Hessen–Rundfahrt
 1st Stage 2 Bayern Rundfahrt
 3rd Châteauroux Classic
 3rd Paris–Brussels
 3rd Grand Prix de Fourmies
2006
 1st Stage 1 Circuit de Lorraine
 1st Stage 2 Route du Sud
 3rd Tro-Bro Léon
2007
 1st Stage 1 Paris–Nice
 1st Stage 1 Route du Sud
 2nd Omloop van de Vlaamse Scheldeboorden
 8th Grand Prix de Denain

References

1977 births
Living people
Sportspeople from Épinal
French male cyclists
French Tour de France stage winners
Tour de France Champs Elysées stage winners
Cyclists from Grand Est